Nagbabagang Luha is a Philippine television drama series broadcast by GMA Network. It aired on the network's Afternoon Prime line up and worldwide via GMA Pinoy TV from August 2, 2021, to October 23, 2021.

Series overview

Episodes
<onlyinclude>

References

Lists of Philippine drama television series episodes